Mid-Pentecost or Midfeast, also Meso-Pentecost (from );  is a feast day which occurs during the Paschal season in the Eastern Orthodox Church and those Eastern Catholic Churches which follow the Byzantine Rite.

Mid-Pentecost celebrates the midpoint between the Feasts of Pascha (Easter) and Pentecost. Specifically, it falls on the 25th day of Pascha.  At the feast of Mid-Pentecost, a Small Blessing of the Waters is traditionally performed after the liturgy of the feast.

Mid-Pentecost is a one-week feast which begins on the 4th Wednesday of Pascha, and continues until the following Wednesday. That is to say, it has an Afterfeast of seven days. Throughout these eight days (including the day of the feast) hymns of Mid-Pentecost are joined to those of the Paschal season. Many of the hymns from the first day of the feast are repeated on the Apodosis (leave-taking of the feast). Although it is ranked as a Feast of the Lord and has an Afterfeast, Mid-Pentecost itself is not considered to be one of the Great Feasts of the church year.

The liturgical texts for the feast are found in the Pentecostarion (the liturgical book containing propers for the period from Pascha to Pentecost). There are three Old Testament readings appointed for Vespers; but, uniquely, no Matins Gospel. In some places an All-Night Vigil is celebrated for this feast, though a Vigil is not called for in the Typicon (book of rubrics).

The theme of the feast is Christ as Teacher, based upon the words from the Gospel of the day: "Now about the midst of the feast Jesus went up into the temple, and taught...Jesus answered them, and said, My doctrine is not mine, but his that sent me. If any man will do his will, he shall know of the doctrine, whether it be of God, or whether I speak of myself."  

While the Gospel refers to the Feast of Sukkot (Greek: Σκηνοπηγία), the icon of the feast depicts the young Jesus in the Temple in Jerusalem speaking with the Elders, the first biblical example of Jesus as teacher (Rabbi). In traditional Orthodox icons of this subject, the figure of Jesus is depicted larger than those of the Elders, showing his superior spiritual status.

The Troparion of the Feast hints at the encounter of Jesus with the Samaritan Woman, which will be celebrated on the following Sunday:

In the middle of the Feast, O Savior, fill my thirsting soul with the waters of godliness, as Thou didst cry to all: 'If anyone thirst, let him come to Me and drink'. O Christ God, Fountain of our life, glory be to Thee!

The scripture verse from John 7, quoted by the Troparion, will be read on the day of Pentecost.

Mid-Pentecost, has historically been the Altar Feast of the Cathedral of Hagia Sophia in Constantinople (Istanbul).

Notes

External links

Midfeast of Pentecost Orthodox icon and synaxarion
 From Pascha to Pentecost: The Penticostarion period / Greek Orthodox Metropolis of Toronto

Eastern Orthodox liturgical days
Byzantine Rite
Pentecost
Eastertide
April observances
May observances
Folk calendar of the East Slavs